is a former Japanese football player. Hasabe made two appearances in the J1 League for Albirex Niigata.

Career
Hasebe was born near Niigata and joined local side Albirex Niigata as a trainee from school. Hasebe is a graduate of the Albirex youth academy and signed his first professional contract in the winter of 2008. He made his first team debut on 3 May 2008 in the J1 League match against Oita Trinita, coming on as a second-half substitute for Fumiya Kogure in the 45th minute. During the 2009 season, Hasebe was loaned out to Regional Leagues side Japan Soccer College, and later Japan Football League side Zweigen Kanazawa. In total Hasebe made 41 appearances for these clubs.

Club statistics

References

External links

1990 births
Living people
Association football people from Niigata Prefecture
Japanese footballers
J1 League players
Japan Football League players
Albirex Niigata players
Japan Soccer College players
Zweigen Kanazawa players
Association football midfielders